The 33rd General Assembly of Nova Scotia represented Nova Scotia between 1901 and 1906.

The Liberal Party led by George Henry Murray formed the government.

Thomas Robertson was chosen as speaker in 1902. Frederick Andrew Laurence was speaker from 1903 to 1904. Edward Matthew Farrell was named speaker in 1905.

The assembly was dissolved on May 22, 1906.

List of Members 

Notes:

References 
 

Terms of the General Assembly of Nova Scotia
1901 establishments in Nova Scotia
1906 disestablishments in Nova Scotia
20th century in Nova Scotia